Manatees are large marine mammals that inhabit slow rivers, canals, saltwater bays, estuaries, and coastal areas. They are a migratory species, inhabiting the Florida waters during the winter and moving as far north as Virginia and into the Chesapeake Bay, sometimes seen as far north as Baltimore, Maryland and as far west as Texas in the warmer summer months. Manatees are calm herbivores that spend most of their time eating, sleeping, and traveling. They have a lifespan of about 60 years with no known natural enemies. Some of their deaths are the result of human activity. In the past, manatees were exploited for their meat, fat, and hides.

Sources of danger 
Various human activities threaten manatee populations. Fishing nets and lines can cause injuries to manatees that can lead to serious infections. Some manatee deaths are the result of collisions with boats.  Additionally, coastal development can affect manatee habitats, both positively and negatively. Manatees tend to gather in the warm water outflows of power plants and springs during cold weather.

Becoming endangered / legal protection 
Starting in the 18th century when the English declared Florida a manatee sanctuary and made manatee hunting illegal, people have worked to protect this species. In 1893, manatees first received protection under Florida law, and in 1907 this law was revised to impose a fine of $500 and/or six months of jail time for assaulting or killing a manatee. In accordance with the Endangered Species Preservation Act of 1966, an act of Congress designed to list endangered animal species and offer them limited protection, the manatee became one of 78 original species listed as being threatened with extinction. There are currently more than 1300 species on this list. On March 11, 1967 federal efforts to protect the manatee began when the United States Fish and Wildlife Service listed the manatee as endangered.

In 1972, the manatee was designated a marine mammal protected under the Federal Marine Mammal Protection Act. This act prohibited the removal of any marine mammal and imposed a fine of up to $2000 and/or one year in jail for doing so. The Endangered Species Act of 1969 was revised in 1973 and increased federal protection of manatees. The “act made it a violation to harass, harm, pursue, hunt, shoot, wound, kill, capture, or collect an endangered species…authorized cooperative agreements between states and the federal government with funding management, research and law enforcement.”

In 1974, the Sirenia Project was established in Gainesville, Florida to provide manatee documentation and rescue programs. In 1976, Sea World of Florida began a Manatee Rescue and Rehabilitation Program. The Florida Manatee Sanctuary Act passed in 1978, amending the 1907 state law. Florida became an official refuge and sanctuary for the marine mammals, and the regulation of boat speeds in areas of manatee inhabitation became allowed. In that same year, the U. S. Fish and Wildlife Service, Florida Audubon Society, and Sea World also sponsored the “West Indian Manatee Workshop” in which six management recommendations were proposed: regulations to control boaters and divers, land acquisition for refuges, study of potential artificial refuges, explore technological control mechanisms to protect manatees, develop oil spill contingency plans, and increase public education.

In 1979, Florida Governor Bob Graham made November Manatee Awareness Month, and the first state-designated protection zones were established. The year 1980 saw Congress allocate $100, 000 to the Marine Mammal Commission and the development of the initial Federal Manatee Recovery Plan by the U. S. Fish and Wildlife Service. In 1981, Bob Graham and Jimmy Buffett formed the Save the Manatee Committee, the precursor of the Save the Manatee Club, which sought to protect manatees and their habitats. Both the Marine Mammal Protection Act and the Endangered Species Act were reauthorized in 1988 as various new groups, companies, and organizations began to invest time and resources in the protection of the manatee. The early 1990s saw more government money being allocated to the cause, more research being conducted, and more protection plans being implemented.

The U.S. Fish and Wildlife Service revised the Manatee Recovery Plan Objectives in 1996 to include the following: assess and minimize causes of manatee mortality and injury, protect essential habitat, determine and monitor the status of the manatee population and essential habitat, coordinate, and oversee cooperative recovery work. Throughout the early 2000s (decade), various counties in Florida continued to revise and/or create specific conservation plans in conjunction with federal and statewide efforts.

As of January 7, 2016, as a result of significant improvements in its population and habitat conditions, and reductions in direct threats, the U.S. Fish and Wildlife Service announced that the West Indian manatee is proposed to be downlisted from endangered to threatened status under the Endangered Species Act (ESA). The proposal to downlist the manatee to threatened will not affect federal protections currently afforded by the ESA, and the Service remains committed to conservation actions to fully recover manatee populations.  The range-wide minimum known population is estimated to be at least 13,000 manatees, with more than 6,300 in Florida. When aerial surveys began in 1991, there were only an estimated 1,267 manatees in Florida, meaning that the last 25 years has seen a 400 percent increase in the species population in that state.

Organizations 
Various institutes help promote awareness of the threats faced by manatees, raise money for manatee research, and generally work to ensure the survival of this endangered species. One of the largest and most influential organizations is the Save the Manatee Club. This non-profit organization was created by Bob Graham and Jimmy Buffett as a means of including the public in manatee conservation. The club sponsors an Adopt-A-Manatee program that uses it funds for “public awareness and education projects; manatee research; rescue and rehabilitation efforts; and advocacy and legal action in order to ensure better protection for manatees and their habitat.” It also sponsors various public awareness, education, and volunteer activities.

Sirenian International is another organization dedicated to the conservation of manatees. The group considers itself a “partnership of scientists, students, educators, conservationists, and the public” that sponsors various projects throughout the world. Membership is divided into three groups based upon financial contributions and active service to the organization: participating member, supporting member, and contributing member.

SeaWorld of Florida has played a major role in the efforts to protect and conserve the manatees. Sea World has the authority to rescue and rehabilitate manatees, and has had a great deal of success doing so. Evidence of this is shown by the fact that eight manatees were rescued and five were returned to their natural environments by Sea World of Florida’s rescue team in 2007. Additionally, the theme park has an exhibit titled “Manatees: The Last Generation?” aimed at educating guests about the importance of protecting this endangered species.

One of the most popular efforts to raise money for manatee research and conservation is the sale of license plates by the Florida Fish and Wildlife Conservation Commission. The proceeds of these sales make up a large percentage of the funds dedicated to this cause, having raised $34,000,000 since 1990. Money collected from decal sales, boat registration fees, and voluntary donations also contribute to the Save the Manatee Trust Fund. A newly redesigned license plate was released in December 2007.

Manatee Appreciation Day is celebrated on the last Wednesday of March in the United States. Florida celebrates Manatee Awareness Month during November, which has been endorsed by comedian Alec Baldwin.

See also
 Manatee
 Endangered species
 Florida Fish and Wildlife Conservation Commission
 USS Manatee (AO-58)
 Manatee awareness

References

Rxternal links
 

Animal welfare and rights in the United States
Sirenians